Camurlim, also known as Ambora, is a village in Salcete taluka in Goa, India. It is situate about 45 km south of the lively city of Mapusa, well known for its weekly Friday market.

Location 
It is located to the south-west of Raia and to the north-east of Loutolim,  from the state capital Panaji.

History 
Camurlim is associated with many stories that highlight its past glory. In one such tale, one part of the village, which was called Diullbhatta, was the designated meeting place of people from Salcete's 60 villages and 10 corporations. Through a series of debates, called sotorbonderachembatta, the 70 people representing each area would decide on important matters.
 
Another tale shows that to begin the celebrations of Konsachem Fest (harvest feast) on August 5, the parish priest of the Our Lady of Snows Church in Raia could only cut the first bundle of rice only after Camurlim village had done so.

Sonfator, Naquelim, Dollanvaddo, Nirboga vaddo, Uzro, Gavon, Tembia, Dongri, Kurgutti, Zorivaddo, Kulsabhatt, etc are the various wadde (wards) of the village.

Demographics 
According to the 2011 Census, Camurlim has a population of about 2300, with 5% belonging to the Scheduled tribes. About 35% of the population belongs to the working class. Most of the villagers are Christians and are of the chardo (kshatriya) caste. The eight vangores (clans) of the village are Antao, Mascarenhas, Sousa, Dias, Carvalho, Quadros, Fernandes and Cardozo.

Attractions 
 Our Lady of Candelaria Church and Chapel
 Ambora and Uzro zora (springs)
 Jila Bakery

Notable residents 
 Monsignor Gregorio Magno de Souza e Antao (1909-1971) - He was a professor at Rachol Seminary and wrote on canon law
 Bishop Theodore Mascarenhas - currently general secretary of CBCI (Catholic Bishops Conference of India)
 Dr Yuri Dias Amborkar - Head of Plastic Surgery at Goa Medical College
 Jose Francisco Antao - Baker. Began as a trainee at the Taj Hotel, Mumbai, and later christened as puddingwala
 Colonel Neville Dias - part of Madras regiment's infantry and later became the defence attaché to China
 Antonio Caetano Antao - musician in the Indian Navy and awardee of Kala Gaurav Puraskar for 2012-13
 Prof. Patrick V Dias - Head of the Department of Sociology at Frankfurt University in Germany
 Dr Jeremy Dias - previously director of health services
 Rosario Antao - footballer, part of Dempo Sports Club and Mumbai's Orkay Mills FC
 Felicio Cardoso - journalist and editor of the publication Goencho Saad

Gallery

References 

Villages in South Goa district